Chlorodesmis is a genus of green algae in the family Udoteaceae.  Algae in this genus produce the toxic diterpene chlorodesmin to defend themselves against generalist herbivores This toxin also kills certain corals that touch the alga. Certain fish like the green coral goby that live in the corals eat the alga to enhance their own toxicity. Other coral dwelling fish like Paragobiodon echinocephalus actively trim the alga even though they don't eat it.

References

External links

Bryopsidales genera
Udoteaceae